Palouse Falls is a waterfall on the Palouse River, about  upstream of the confluence with the Snake River in southeast Washington, United States. It is in the  Palouse Falls State Park.

Geology
These falls and the canyon downstream are an important feature of the channeled scablands created by the great Missoula floods that swept periodically across eastern Washington and across the Columbia River Plateau during the Pleistocene epoch.

The ancestral Palouse River flowed through the currently dry Washtucna Coulee to the Columbia River. The Palouse Falls and surrounding canyons were created when the Missoula floods overtopped the south valley wall of the ancestral Palouse River, diverting it to the current course to the Snake River by erosion of a new channel.

The area is characterized by interconnected and hanging flood-created coulees, cataracts, plunge pools, kolk-created potholes, rock benches, buttes, and pinnacles typical of scablands. Palouse Falls State Park is located at the falls, protecting this part of the uniquely scenic area.

Economic proposals 
In 1984, the Franklin County Public Utility District proposed a  dam be constructed upstream of the falls, allowing for a significant hydraulic head for hydroelectric power generation. This would have provided over one-third of the county's power and would have reduced ratepayer charges substantially. However, the majority of the ratepayers declined to approve the investment, preserving this geologically significant feature.

Palouse Falls State Park
The falls are included in Washington's Palouse Falls State Park, which provides access to the falls and has displays explaining the region's unique geology, as well as its historical ties (the Palouse Indians and the Mullan Road both took advantage of the easy access to the plateau in the vicinity of the falls). The park provides a viewpoint facing Palouse Falls that is a short walk from the parking area, campground, and picnic area.  A larger trail system is being developed by the parks department. The state park was created in 1951 following the contribution of several parcels of land by multiple donors. The park has a short, ADA-accessible trail with falls overlook and facilities for picnicking and tent camping.

Kayaking
On April 21, 2009, Tyler Bradt ran the falls in a kayak, setting an unofficial world record for the highest waterfall run. Bradt's media agent released the video footage of him dropping over the falls to Sports Illustrated, which carried it on its website. The magazine carried a two-page photo of the feat in its May 18 issue. The photos were also reproduced in Spain's Hola magazine's international issue of September 23, 2009.

Height of the falls
As a result of the unofficial world record for the highest waterfall run, questions were raised about the correct height of the main drop for the falls. The Spokesman-Review inquired with Washington state officials and determined that the previous height measurement was performed in 1945 using earlier techniques; the state was not prepared to perform an updated measurement using laser surveying equipment. However, a Whitman College geology professor led a team of students who determined:

 The height of the plunge pool and the top pool both vary with river flows, but not uniformly.
 Hence, a  variability was seen in the height of falls over this period.

Official state waterfall
On February 12, 2014, the Washington House of Representatives passed HB 2119 unanimously to make Palouse Falls the official state waterfall in Washington. The proposal for the bill originated when a group of elementary school students in the nearby town of Washtucna lobbied the state legislature.

References

External links

Palouse Falls State Park

 

Landforms of Franklin County, Washington
Geology of Washington (state)
Waterfalls of Washington (state)
State parks of Washington (state)
Landforms of Whitman County, Washington